Indian Hot Springs, also known as Holladay Hot Springs, is a populated place situated in Graham County, Arizona, United States.

Geothermal springs
The hot springs located at Indian Hot Springs emerge from the ground at a temperature of 118°F / 48°C.

See also
 Indian Hot Springs

References

Populated places in Graham County, Arizona